Hemizonella  is a genus of North American plants in the tribe Madieae within the family Asteraceae.

The only known species is Hemizonella minima (opposite-leaved tarweed), native to British Columbia, Washington, Oregon, California, Montana, Idaho, Nevada

The plant grows in many types of forest, scrub, and chaparral habitats, from mountains to deserts. It is found in the Sierra Nevada and Cascade Range, and Mojave Desert.

The inflorescence produces one or more tiny flower heads which are oblong or shaped like tops on close inspection. Each is a few millimeters wide, enclosed in phyllaries studded with stalked resin glands, and tipped with minute yellowish florets. The fruit is an achene a few millimeters long with no pappus.

References 

Monotypic Asteraceae genera
Flora of British Columbia
Flora of the Western United States
Madieae